Suzanne Ferrand (born 1902) was a French artist and illustrator. She illustrated two World War I posters. One was titled (in French), "Grow Wheat, It is Gold for France." It prominently features wheat, a sickle, and the French flag. The second poster released in 1918, was titled (in French), "Save Your Wine For Our Soldiers." On the poster is a wine jug, a vine of grapes, and a cup filled with wine.

Her contemporaries were artists Celia Fiennes, Vera Allison, Theodor Baumgartner, Francesco De Rocchi, and William Beattie.

References

1902 births
20th-century French women artists
World War I artists
Poster artists
Year of death missing